Serena and Venus Williams were the defending champions, but could not defend after Venus withdrew with a back injury before the start of competition.

Hsieh Su-wei and Peng Shuai defeated Ashleigh Barty and Casey Dellacqua in the final, 7–6(7–1), 6–1 to win the ladies' doubles tennis title at the 2013 Wimbledon Championships.

Seeds

  Sara Errani /  Roberta Vinci (third round)
  Andrea Hlaváčková /  Lucie Hradecká (quarterfinals)
  Nadia Petrova /  Katarina Srebotnik (quarterfinals)
  Ekaterina Makarova /  Elena Vesnina (third round)
  Raquel Kops-Jones /  Abigail Spears (third round)
  Liezel Huber /  Sania Mirza (third round)
  Anna-Lena Grönefeld /  Květa Peschke (semifinals)
  Hsieh Su-wei /  Peng Shuai (champions)
  Anastasia Pavlyuchenkova /  Lucie Šafářová (first round)
  Kristina Mladenovic /  Galina Voskoboeva (second round)
  Cara Black /  Marina Erakovic (second round)
  Ashleigh Barty /  Casey Dellacqua (final)
  Vania King /  Zheng Jie (third round)
  Daniela Hantuchová /  Maria Kirilenko (second round, withdrew)
  Chan Hao-ching /  Anabel Medina Garrigues (first round)
  Julia Görges /  Barbora Záhlavová-Strýcová (quarterfinals)

Qualifying

Draw

Finals

Top half

Section 1

Section 2

Bottom half

Section 3

Section 4

References

External links

2013 Wimbledon Championships on WTAtennis.com
2013 Wimbledon Championships – Women's draws and results at the International Tennis Federation

Women's Doubles
Wimbledon Championship by year – Women's doubles
Wimbledon Championships
Wimbledon Championships